Sergey Morozov may refer to:
Sergey Morozov (fighter) (born 1989), Russian mixed martial artist
Sergei Borisovich Morozov (born 1989), Russian footballer who played at the 2006 Euro U-17 tournament
Sergey Morozov (racewalker) (born 1988), Russian race walker
Sergey Ivanovich Morozov (born 1959), Russian politician
Serhiy Morozov (1950 – 2021), Soviet international football player and Ukrainian football coach
Serhiy N. Morozov (born 1961), Ukrainian football player who was the best scorer of Estonian league in 1994–1995 season
Sergey Morozov, businessman, creator of Grand Maket Rossiya, private museum.